Mount Augusta, also designated Boundary Peak 183, is a high peak in the state of Alaska.

It forms the eastern end of the long ridge of which Mount Saint Elias is the center and highest point.

The Seward Glacier starts to the north of the peak, separating it from Mount Logan, and then flows around the east side of the peak, forming the gap between Augusta and the peaks surrounding Mount Cook. It then continues south to join the Malaspina Glacier.

Name origin
Mount Augusta was named in 1891 by I.C. Russell of the USGS, for his wife J. Augusta Olmsted Russell.

Notable Features
In terms of pure elevation, Mount Augusta is not particularly notable, being one of the lowest fourteeners in the United States; it is therefore quite overshadowed by its huge neighbors Saint Elias and Logan. However, it is a huge peak in terms of local relief, since it lies so close to low terrain (and in fact close to tidewater). For example, it drops 10,000 feet (3,050m) to the Seward Glacier on the southeast side of the peak in approximately 3.5 miles (5.6 km).

Climbing
 1952 North Ridge (the eastern of two north ridges), FA of peak by Peter Schoening, Victor Josendal, Bill Niendorff, Richard E. McGowan, Bob Yeasting, Gibson Reynolds, Tom Morris, Verl Rogers, summiting on July 4.
 1987 a party led by noted Canadian mountaineer Don Serl ascended a route on the North Rib and West Ridge.
 1990 South Ridge. Mark Bebie (U.S.) and Bill Pilling reached the summit after a climb of six days.

See also

List of mountain peaks of North America
List of mountain peaks of Canada
List of mountain peaks of the United States
List of Boundary Peaks of the Alaska-British Columbia/Yukon border

Bibliography

Sources

External links

 Mount Augusta photo: Flickr
Mount Augusta on Topozone
"Mount Augusta, Yukon Territory/Alaska" on Peakbagger

Mountains of Alaska
Four-thousanders of Yukon
Saint Elias Mountains
Mountains of Yakutat City and Borough, Alaska
Canada–United States border
International mountains of North America
Mount Augusta